Lay is a surname. Notable people with the surname include:

Alfred Morrison Lay (1836–1879), U.S. politician
Beirne Lay, Jr. (1909–1982), American author and World War II aviator
Benjamin Lay (1681–1760), English Quaker and abolitionist
Bob Lay (1944–2022), Australian sprinter
Caren Lay (born 1972), German politician
Carol Lay (born 1952), American author
Cecil Howard Lay (1885–1956), English poet
Charles Downing Lay (1877–1956), American landscape architect
Donald P. Lay (1926–2007), American jurist
Elzy Lay (1868–1934), U.S. outlaw
George W. Lay (1798-1860), U.S. politician
George Tradescant Lay (c. 1800-1845), British naturalist, missionary and diplomat
Herman Lay (1909–1982), American businessman
Horatio Nelson Lay (1832–1898), British diplomat
Humberto Lay (born 25 September 1934), Peruvian evangelical pastor
Jeffrey Lay (born 1969), Canadian rower
John Louis Lay (1832–1899), American inventor
Josh Lay (born 1982), American football player
Kenneth Lay (1942–2006), U.S. businessman
Ken Lay (police officer) (born 1956), Australian police commissioner
Ko Lay (born 31 October 1931), Burmese politician
Oliver Ingraham Lay (1845-1890), American portrait painter.
Sam Lay (1935–2022), American drummer and vocalist
Stan Lay (1906–2003), New Zealand track and field athlete
Susan Lay (born March 13, 1985), English actress, musician, and TV presenter